Cocculinella coercita is a species of small, deep water sea snail, a marine gastropod mollusk in the family Cocculinellidae, the limpets.

References

External links
 To World Register of Marine Species

Cocculinellidae
Gastropods described in 1907